The Second Punic War (218 to 201 BC) was the second of three wars fought between Carthage and Rome, the two main powers of the western Mediterranean in the 3rd century BC. For 17 years the two states struggled for supremacy, primarily in Italy and Iberia, but also on the islands of Sicily and Sardinia and, towards the end of the war, in North Africa. After immense materiel and human losses on both sides the Carthaginians were defeated. Macedonia, Syracuse and several Numidian kingdoms were drawn into the fighting, and Iberian and Gallic forces fought on both sides. There were three main military theatres during the war: Italy, where Hannibal defeated the Roman legions repeatedly, with occasional subsidiary campaigns in Sicily, Sardinia and Greece; Iberia, where Hasdrubal, a younger brother of Hannibal, defended the Carthaginian colonial cities with mixed success before moving into Italy; and Africa, where Rome finally won the war.

The First Punic War had ended in a Roman victory in 241BC after 23 years and enormous losses on both sides. After the war Carthage expanded its holdings in Iberia where in 219BC a Carthaginian army under Hannibal besieged, captured and sacked the pro-Roman city of Saguntum. In early 218BC Rome declared war on Carthage, beginning the Second Punic War. Later that year, Hannibal surprised the Romans by marching his army overland from Iberia, through Gaul and over the Alps to Cisalpine Gaul (modern northern Italy). Reinforced by Gallic allies he obtained crushing victories over the Romans at the battles of Trebia (218) and Lake Trasimene (217). Moving to southern Italy in 216 Hannibal defeated the Romans again at the battle of Cannae, where he annihilated the largest army the Romans had ever assembled. After the death or capture of more than 120,000 Roman troops in less than three years, many of Rome's Italian allies, notably Capua, defected to Carthage, giving Hannibal control over much of southern Italy. As Syracuse and Macedonia joined the Carthaginian side after Cannae, the conflict spread. Between 215 and 210 BC the Carthaginians attempted to capture Roman-held Sicily and Sardinia, but were unsuccessful. The Romans took drastic steps to raise new legions: enrolling slaves, criminals and those who did not meet the usual property qualification; this vastly increased the number of men they had under arms. For the next decade the war in southern Italy continued, with Roman armies slowly recapturing most of the Italian cities that had joined Carthage.

The Romans established a lodgement in north-east Iberia in 218 BC; the Carthaginians repeatedly attempted and failed to reduce it. In 211 the Romans took the offensive in Iberia and were badly defeated but maintained their hold on the north east. In 209 BC the new Roman commander Publius Scipio captured Carthago Nova, the main Carthaginian base in the peninsula. In 208 Scipio defeated Hasdrubal, although Hasdrubal was able to withdraw most of his troops into Gaul and then Cisalpine Gaul in spring 207 BC. This new Carthaginian invasion was defeated at the Battle of the Metaurus. At the battle of Ilipa in 206 Scipio permanently ended the Carthaginian presence in Iberia.

Scipio invaded Carthaginian Africa in 204 BC, compelling the Carthaginian Senate to recall Hannibal's army from Italy. The final engagement of the war took place between armies under Scipio and Hannibal at Zama in 202 and resulted in Hannibal's defeat and in Carthage suing for peace. The peace treaty dictated by Rome stripped Carthage of all of its overseas territories and some of its African ones. An indemnity of 10,000 silver talents was to be paid over 50 years. Carthage was prohibited from waging war outside Africa, and in Africa only with Rome's express permission. Henceforth it was clear Carthage was politically subordinate to Rome. Rome used Carthaginian military activity against the Numidians as a pretext to declare war again in 149BC starting the Third Punic War. In 146BC the Romans stormed the city of Carthage, sacked it, slaughtered most of its population and completely demolished it.

Primary sources 

The most reliable source for the Second Punic War is the historian Polybius ( – ), a Greek sent to Rome in 167BC as a hostage. He is best known for The Histories, written sometime after 146BC. Polybius's work is considered broadly objective and largely neutral between Carthaginian and Roman points of view. Polybius was an analytical historian and wherever possible interviewed participants, from both sides, in the events he wrote about. Modern historians consider Polybius to have treated the relatives of Scipio Aemilianus, his patron and friend, unduly favourably but the consensus is to accept his account largely at face value. The modern historian Andrew Curry sees Polybius as being "fairly reliable"; Craige Champion describes him as "a remarkably well-informed, industrious, and insightful historian".

Much of Polybius's account of the Second Punic War is missing after 216 BC or only exists in fragmentary form. As a result, the main source for much of the war is the account written by the Roman historian Livy. This is commonly used by modern historians where Polybius's account is not extant. Livy relied heavily on Polybius, but wrote in a more structured way, with more details about Roman politics; he was also openly pro-Roman. His accounts of military encounters are often demonstrably inaccurate; the classicist Adrian Goldsworthy says Livy's "reliability is often suspect", and the historian Phillip Sabin refers to Livy's "military ignorance".

Other, later, ancient histories of the war exist, although often in fragmentary or summary form. Modern historians usually take into account the writings of Diodorus Siculus and Cassius Dio, two Greek authors writing during the Roman era; they are described by John Lazenby as "clearly far inferior" to Livy, but some fragments of Polybius can be recovered from their texts. The Greek moralist Plutarch wrote several biographies of Roman commanders in his Parallel Lives. Other sources include coins, inscriptions, archaeological evidence and empirical evidence from reconstructions.

Opposing forces 

Most male Roman citizens were liable for military service and would serve as infantry, the wealthier equites providing a cavalry component. Traditionally, when at war the Romans would raise four legions, each of 4,200 infantry and 300 cavalry. Approximately 1,200 of the infantry, poorer or younger men unable to afford the armour and equipment of a standard legionary, served as javelin-armed skirmishers, known as velites. They carried several javelins, which would be thrown from a distance, a short sword and a  shield. The rest were equipped as heavy infantry, with body armour, a large shield and short thrusting swords. They were divided into three ranks: the front rank also carried two javelins, while the second and third ranks were equipped with a thrusting spear instead. Legionary sub-units and individual legionaries both fought in relatively open order. It was the long-standing Roman procedure to elect two men each year as senior magistrates, known as consuls, who in time of war would each lead an army. An army was usually formed by combining two Roman legions with a similarly sized and equipped pair of legions provided by their Latin allies; these legions usually had a larger attached complement of cavalry than Roman ones.

Carthaginian citizens only served in their army if there was a direct threat to the city. When they did, they fought as well-armoured heavy infantry armed with long thrusting spears, although they were notoriously ill-trained and ill-disciplined. In most circumstances Carthage recruited foreigners to make up its army. Many were from North Africa and these were frequently referred to as "Libyans". The region provided several types of fighters, including: close-order infantry equipped with large shields, helmets, short swords and long thrusting spears; javelin-armed light infantry skirmishers; close-order shock cavalry (also known as "heavy cavalry") carrying spears; and light cavalry skirmishers who threw javelins from a distance and avoided close combat. (The latter cavalry were usually Numidians.) The close-order Libyan infantry and the citizen-militia would fight in a tightly packed formation known as a phalanx. On occasion some of the infantry would wear captured Roman armour, especially among Hannibal's troops. In addition both Iberia and Gaul provided large numbers of experienced infantry and cavalry. These infantry were unarmoured troops who would charge ferociously, but had a reputation for breaking off if a combat was protracted. The Gallic cavalry, and possibly some of the Iberians, wore armour and fought as close-order troops; most or all of the mounted Iberians were light cavalry. Slingers were frequently recruited from the Balearic Islands. The Carthaginians also employed war elephants; North Africa had indigenous African forest elephants at the time.

Garrison duty and land blockades were the most common operations. When armies were campaigning, surprise attacks, ambushes and stratagems were common. If either commander felt at a disadvantage, they might march off without engaging. In such circumstances it was difficult to force a battle if the other commander was unwilling to fight. Forming up in battle order was a complicated and premeditated affair, which took several hours. Infantry were usually positioned in the centre of the battle line, with light infantry skirmishers to their front and cavalry on each flank. Many battles were decided when one side's infantry force was attacked in the flank or rear and they were partially or wholly enveloped.

Both states possessed large fleets throughout the war. The Carthaginian fleet rarely put to sea, and when it did it was usually to escort transport ships; it rarely acted aggressively. This gave the Romans naval superiority for the duration of the war.

Background 

The Roman Republic had been aggressively expanding in the southern Italian mainland for a century and had conquered peninsular Italy south of the Arno River by 270BC, when the Greek cities of southern Italy (Magna Graecia) submitted. During this period of Roman expansion, Carthage, with its capital in what is now Tunisia, had come to dominate southern Iberia, much of the coastal regions of North Africa, the Balearic Islands, Corsica, Sardinia and the western half of Sicily. By 264BC Carthage was the dominant external power on Sicily, and Carthage and Rome were the preeminent powers in the western Mediterranean. Relationships were good, the two states had several times declared their mutual friendship and there were strong commercial links. According to the classicist Richard Miles Rome's expansionary attitude after southern Italy came under its control combined with Carthage's proprietary approach to Sicily caused the two powers to stumble into war more by accident than design. The immediate cause of the First Punic War was the issue of control of the independent Sicilian city state of Messana (modern Messina). In 264BC Carthage and Rome went to war.

The war was fought primarily on Sicily and its surrounding waters; the Romans also unsuccessfully invaded North Africa in 256BC. It was the longest continuous conflict and the greatest naval war of antiquity, with immense materiel and human losses on both sides. In 241BC, after 23 years of war, the Carthaginians were defeated. Under the Roman-dictated Treaty of Lutatius Carthage ceded its Sicilian possessions to Rome. Rome exploited Carthage's distraction during the Truceless War against rebellious mercenaries and Libyan subjects to break the peace treaty and annex Carthaginian Sardinia and Corsica in 238 BC. Under the leadership of Hamilcar Barca, Carthage defeated the rebels in 237 BC.

With the suppression of the rebellion, Hamilcar understood that Carthage needed to strengthen its economic and military base if it were to confront Rome again; Carthaginian possessions in Iberia (modern Spain and Portugal) were limited to a handful of prosperous coastal cities in the south and Hamilcar took the army which he had led in the Truceless War to Iberia in 237BC and carved out a quasi-monarchical, autonomous state in southern and eastern Iberia. This gave Carthage the silver mines, agricultural wealth, manpower, military facilities such as shipyards, and territorial depth to stand up to future Roman demands with confidence. Hamilcar ruled as a viceroy and was succeeded by his son-in-law, Hasdrubal, in 229BC and then his son, Hannibal, in 221BC. In 226BC the Ebro Treaty was agreed with Rome, specifying the Ebro River as the northern boundary of the Carthaginian sphere of influence. At some time during the next six years Rome made a separate agreement with the city of Saguntum, which was situated well south of the Ebro. In 219BC a Carthaginian army under Hannibal besieged Saguntum, and after eight months captured and sacked it. Rome complained to the Carthaginian government, sending an embassy to its senate with peremptory demands. When these were rejected Rome declared war in spring 218BC.

Since the end of the First Punic War Rome had also been expanding, especially in the area of north Italy either side of the River Po known as Cisalpine Gaul. Roman attempts to establish towns and farms in the region from 232 BC led to repeated wars with the local Gallic tribes, who were finally defeated in 222. In 218 the Romans pushed even further north, establishing two new towns, or "colonies", on the Po and appropriating large areas of the best land. Most of the Gauls simmered with resentment at this intrusion.

Italy

Hannibal crosses the Alps, 218 BC 

During 218BC there was some naval skirmishing in the waters around Sicily; the Romans repulsed a Carthaginian attack and captured the island of Malta. In Cisalpine Gaul (modern northern Italy), the major Gallic tribes attacked the Roman colonies there, causing the settlers to flee to their previously established colony of Mutina (modern Modena), where they were besieged. A Roman relief force broke through the siege, but was then ambushed and itself besieged. An army had previously been raised by the Romans to campaign in Iberia, but the Roman Senate detached one Roman and one allied legion from it to send to north Italy. Recruiting fresh troops to replace these delayed the army's departure for Iberia until September. At the same time a Roman army in Sicily under the consul Sempronius Longus was preparing for an invasion of Africa.

Meanwhile, Hannibal assembled a Carthaginian army in New Carthage (modern Cartagena) and led it northwards along the Iberian coast in May or June. It entered Gaul and took an inland route, to avoid the Roman allies to the south. At the battle of Rhone Crossing, Hannibal defeated a force of local Gauls which sought to bar his way. A Roman fleet carrying the Iberian-bound army landed at Rome's ally Massalia (modern Marseille) at the mouth of the Rhone, but Hannibal evaded the Romans and they continued to Iberia. The Carthaginians reached the foot of the Alps by late autumn and crossed them in 15 days, surmounting the difficulties of climate, terrain and the guerrilla tactics of the native tribes. Hannibal arrived in Cisalpine Gaul with 20,000 infantry, 6,000 cavalry and an unknown number of elephantsthe survivors of the 37 with which he left Iberia some time in November; the Romans had already gone into their winter quarters. Hannibal's surprise entry into the Italian peninsula led to the cancellation of Rome's planned campaign for the year: an invasion of Africa.

Carthaginian victories, 218–216 BC 

Shortly after arriving in Italy the Carthaginians captured the chief city of the hostile Taurini (in the area of modern Turin) and seized its food stocks. In late November 218BC the Carthaginian cavalry routed the cavalry and light infantry of the Romans at the battle of Ticinus. As a result, most of the Gallic tribes declared for the Carthaginian cause and Hannibal's army grew to more than 40,000 men. The Senate ordered the army in Sicily north to join the force already facing Hannibal, thus abandoning the plan to invade Africa. The combined Roman force under the command of Sempronius was lured into combat by Hannibal on ground of his choosing at the battle of the Trebia. The Carthaginians encircled the Romans and only 10,000 out of 40,000 were able to fight their way to safety. Having secured his position in Cisalpine Gaul by this victory, Hannibal quartered his troops for the winter among the Gauls. The latter joined his army in large numbers, bringing it up to 50,000 men.

There was shock when news of the defeat reached Rome, but this calmed once Sempronius arrived, to preside over the consular elections in the usual manner. The consuls-elect recruited further legions, both Roman and from Rome's Latin allies; reinforced Sardinia and Sicily against the possibility of Carthaginian raids or invasion; placed garrisons at Tarentum and other places for similar reasons; built a fleet of 60 quinqueremes; and established supply depots at Ariminum and Arretium in preparation for marching north later in the year. Two armiesof four legions each, two Roman and two allied, but with stronger than usual cavalry contingentswere formed. One was stationed at Arretium and one on the Adriatic coast; they would be able to block Hannibal's possible advance into central Italy and were positioned to move north to operate in Cisalpine Gaul.

In early spring 217BC the Carthaginians crossed the Apennines unopposed, taking a difficult but unguarded route. Hannibal attempted to draw the main Roman army under Gaius Flaminius into a pitched battle by devastating the area they had been sent to protect provoking Flaminius into a hasty pursuit. Hannibal set an ambush and in the battle of Lake Trasimene completely defeated the Roman army, killing 15,000 Romans, including Flaminius, and taking 10,000 prisoners. A cavalry force of 4,000 from the other Roman army was also defeated at the Battle of Umbrian Lake and annihilated. The prisoners were badly treated if they were Romans; captured Latin allies were well treated by the Carthaginians and many were freed and sent back to their cities, in the expectation they would speak well of Carthaginian martial prowess and of their treatment. Hannibal hoped some of these allies could be persuaded to defect.

The Carthaginians continued their march through Etruria, then Umbria, to the Adriatic coast, then turned south into Apulia, hoping to win over some of the ethnic Greek and Italic cities of southern Italy. News of the defeat again caused a panic in Rome. Quintus Fabius Maximus was elected dictator by the Roman Assembly and adopted the "Fabian strategy" of avoiding pitched battles, relying instead on low-level harassment to wear the invader down, until Rome could rebuild its military strength. Hannibal was left largely free to ravage Apulia for the next year. Fabius was unpopular at this period with parts of the Roman army, public and the senate, for avoiding battle while Italy was being devastated by the enemy: there was awareness that his tactics would not lead to a quick end to the war. Hannibal marched through the richest and most fertile provinces of Italy, hoping the devastation would draw Fabius into battle, but Fabius refused. The Roman populace derided Fabius as "the Delayer" (in Latin) and in 216 BC elected new consuls: Gaius Terentius Varro, who advocated pursuing a more aggressive war strategy, and Lucius Aemilius Paullus, who advocated a strategy somewhere between Fabius's and that suggested by Varro. 

In the spring of 216 BC Hannibal seized the large supply depot at Cannae on the Apulian plain. The Roman Senate authorised the raising of double-sized armies by Varro and Paullus, a force of 86,000 men, the largest in Roman history up to that point. Hannibal accepted battle on the open plain between the armies in the battle of Cannae. The Roman legions forced their way through Hannibal's deliberately weak centre, but Libyan heavy infantry on the wings swung around their advance, menacing their flanks. Hasdrubal Gisco led the Carthaginian cavalry on the left wing and routed the Roman cavalry opposite, then swept around the rear of the Romans to attack their cavalry on the other wing. The heavily outnumbered Carthaginian infantry held out until Hasdrubal charged into the legions from behind. As a result, the Roman infantry was surrounded with no means of escape. At least 67,500 Romans were killed or captured.

Miles describes Cannae as "Rome's greatest military disaster". Toni Ñaco del Hoyo describes the Trebia, Lake Trasimene and Cannae as the three "great military calamities" suffered by the Romans in the first three years of the war. Brian Carey writes that these three defeats brought Rome to the brink of collapse. Within a few weeks of Cannae a Roman army of 25,000 was ambushed by Boii Gauls in Cisalpine Gaul at the battle of Silva Litana and annihilated. Fabius became consul in 215 BC and was re-elected in 214 BC.

Roman allies defect, 216–214 BC 
Little has survived of Polybius's account of Hannibal's army in Italy after Cannae. Livy gives a fuller record, but according to Goldsworthy "his reliability is often suspect", especially with regard to his descriptions of battles; many modern historians agree, but nevertheless his is the best surviving source for this part of the war.

Several of the city states in southern Italy allied with Hannibal, or were captured when pro-Carthaginian factions betrayed their defences. These included the large city of Capua and the major port city of Tarentum (modern Taranto). Two of the major Samnite tribes also joined the Carthaginian cause. By 214BC the bulk of southern Italy had turned against Rome, although there were many exceptions and the majority of Rome's allies in central Italy remained loyal. All except the smallest towns were too well fortified for Hannibal to take by assault, and blockade could be a long-drawn-out affair, or if the target was a port, impossible. Carthage's new allies felt little sense of community with Carthage, or even with each other. They increased the number of places which Hannibal's army was expected to defend from Roman retribution, but provided relatively few fresh troops to assist him in doing so. Such Italian forces as were raised resisted operating away from their home cities and performed poorly when they did.

An important part of Hannibal's campaign in Italy was to attempt to fight the Romans by using local resources; raising recruits from among the local population. His subordinate Hanno was able to raise troops in Samnium in 214 BC, but the Romans intercepted these new levies in the battle of Beneventum and eliminated them before they rendezvoused with Hannibal. Hannibal could win allies, but defending them against the Romans was a new and difficult problem, as the Romans could still field multiple armies, which in total greatly outnumbered his own forces.

The greatest gain was the second largest city of Italy, Capua, when Hannibal's army marched into Campania in 216 BC. The inhabitants of Capua held limited Roman citizenship and the aristocracy was linked to the Romans via marriage and friendship, but the possibility of becoming the supreme city of Italy after the evident Roman disasters proved too strong a temptation. The treaty between them and Hannibal can be described as an agreement of friendship, since the Capuans had no obligations. When the port city of Locri defected to Carthage in the summer of 215BC it was immediately used to reinforce the Carthaginian forces in Italy with soldiers, supplies and war elephants. It was the only time during the war Carthage reinforced Hannibal. A second force, under Hannibal's youngest brother Mago, was meant to land in Italy in 215BC but was diverted to Iberia after a major Carthaginian defeat there.

Meanwhile, the Romans took drastic steps to raise new legions: enrolling slaves, criminals and those who did not meet the usual property qualification. By early 215BC they were fielding at least 12 legions; by 214BC 18; and by 213BC 22. By 212 BC the full complement of the legions deployed would have been in excess of 100,000 men, plus, as always, a similar number of allied troops. The majority were deployed in southern Italy in field armies of approximately 20,000 men each. This was insufficient to challenge Hannibal's army in open battle, but sufficient to force him to concentrate his forces and to hamper his movements.

Macedonia, Sardinia and Sicily 
During 215BC the Macedonian king, Philip V, pledged his support to Hannibal, initiating the First Macedonian War against Rome in 215BC. The Romans were concerned that the Macedonians would attempt to cross the Strait of Otranto and land in Italy. They strongly reinforced their navy in the area and despatched a legion to stand guard, and the threat petered out. In 211BC Rome contained the Macedonians by allying with the Aetolian League, a coalition of Greek city states which was already at war with Macedonia. In 205BC this war ended with a negotiated peace.

A rebellion in support of the Carthaginians broke out on Sardinia in 213BC, but it was quickly put down by the Romans.

Prior to 215 BC Sicily remained firmly in Roman hands, blocking the ready seaborne reinforcement and resupply of Hannibal from Carthage. Hiero II, the old tyrant of Syracuse of forty-five-years standing and a staunch Roman ally, died in 215BC and his successor Hieronymus was discontented with his situation.  Hannibal negotiated a treaty whereby Syracuse came over to Carthage, at the price of making the whole of Sicily a Syracusan possession. The Syracusan army proved no match for a Roman army led by Claudius Marcellus and by spring 213BC Syracuse was besieged. Both Polybius' and Livy's accounts of the siege focus on Archimedes' invention of war machines to counteract Roman siege warfare, which was already made difficult by the strong defences of the city.

A large Carthaginian army led by Himilco was sent to relieve the city in 213BC and several further Sicilian cities deserted the Romans. In the spring of 212BC the Romans stormed Syracuse in a surprise night assault and captured several districts of the city. Meanwhile, the Carthaginian army was crippled by plague. After the Carthaginians failed to resupply the city, the rest of Syracuse fell in the autumn of 212BC; Archimedes was killed by a Roman soldier.

Carthage sent more reinforcements to Sicily in 211BC and went on the offensive. In 211 BC Hannibal sent a force of Numidian cavalry to Sicily, which was led by the skilled Liby-Phoenician officer Mottones, who inflicted heavy losses on the Roman army through hit-and-run attacks. A fresh Roman army attacked the main Carthaginian stronghold on the island, Agrigentum, in 210BC and the city was betrayed to the Romans by a discontented Carthaginian officer. The remaining Carthaginian-controlled towns then surrendered or were taken through force or treachery and the Sicilian grain supply to Rome and its armies was resumed.

Italy, 213–208 BC 
For 11 years after Cannae the war surged around southern Italy as cities went over to the Carthaginians or were taken by subterfuge and the Romans recaptured them by siege or by suborning factions within to give them entry. Hannibal repeatedly defeated Roman armies, but wherever his main army was not active the Romans threatened Carthaginian-supporting towns or sought battle with Carthaginian or Carthaginian-allied detachments; frequently with success. By 208BC many of the cities and territories which had joined the Carthaginian cause had returned to their Roman allegiance.

Fabius captured the Carthaginian-allied town Arpi in 213 BC. In 212 BC Hannibal destroyed the Roman army of Centenius Penula at the battle of the Silarus in northwest Lucania. Later the same year, Hannibal defeated another Roman army at the battle of Herdonia, with 16,000 men lost from a force of 18,000. Despite these losses, the Romans besieged Capua, the Carthaginians' key ally in Italy. Hannibal offered battle to the Romans; Livy's account of the subsequent fighting is unclear, but the Romans seem to have suffered heavy casualties while the Carthaginians were unable to lift the siege. Hannibal then assaulted the Romans' siege works, but was again unable to relieve the city. In 211BC Hannibal again offered battle to the besieging Roman forces, this time they declined to leave their fortifications. In desperation Hannibal again assaulted them and again failed to break through. He next marched his army towards Rome, hoping to compel the Romans to abandon the siege to defend it; however, the besieging force stayed in place and Capua fell soon afterwards. The city was stripped of its political autonomy and placed under Roman appointees.

In 210 the Carthaginians caught a Roman army off guard outside Herdonia, heavily defeating it after its commander accepted battle. Livy then has Hannibal fighting the inconclusive battle of Numistro, although modern historians doubt his account. The Romans stayed on Hannibal's heels, fighting another pitched battle at Canusium in 209 BC and again suffering heavy losses. This battle enabled another Roman army to approach Tarentum and capture it by treachery.

Italy, 207–203 BC 
In the spring of 207BC Hasdrubal Barca repeated the feat of his elder brother by marching an army across the Alps. He invaded Cisalpine Gaul with an army of 35,000 men, intending to join forces with Hannibal, but Hannibal was unaware of his presence. The Romans facing Hannibal in southern Italy tricked him into believing the whole Roman army was still in camp, while a large portion marched north under the consul Claudius Nero. They reinforced the Romans under the second consul, Marcus Salinator, who were already facing Hasdrubal. This combined Roman force attacked at the battle of the Metaurus and destroyed the Carthaginian army, killing Hasdrubal. This battle confirmed Roman dominance in Italy and marked the end of their Fabian strategy. Without the expected reinforcement Hannibal's forces were compelled to evacuate allied towns and withdraw to Bruttium.

In 205BC Mago Barca, another of Hannibal's younger brothers, landed in Genua in north-west Italy with the remnants of his Spanish army. It soon received Gallic and Ligurian reinforcements. Mago's arrival in the north of the Italian peninsula was followed by Hannibal's inconclusive battle of Crotona in 204BC in the far south of the peninsula. Mago marched his reinforced army towards the lands of Carthage's main Gallic allies in Cisalpine Gaul, but was checked by a large Roman army and defeated at the battle of Insubria in 203BC.

After a Roman army invaded the Carthaginian homeland in 204BC, defeating the Carthaginians in two major battles and winning the allegiance of the Numidian kingdoms of North Africa, Hannibal and the remnants of his army were recalled. They sailed from Croton and landed at Carthage with 15,000–20,000 experienced veterans. Mago was also recalled; he died of wounds on the voyage and some of his ships were intercepted by the Romans, but 12,000 of his troops reached Carthage.

Iberia

Iberia 218–211 BC 

The Roman fleet continued on from Massala in the autumn of 218BC, landing the army it was transporting in north-east Iberia, where it won support among the local tribes. The Romans' lodgement between the Ebro and the Pyrenees blocked the route from Iberia to Italy, making the despatch of reinforcements from Iberia to Hannibal difficult. A Carthaginian attack in late 218BC was repelled at the battle of Cissa. In 217BC 40 Carthaginian and Iberian warships were beaten by 35 Roman and Massalian vessels at the battle of Ebro River, with the loss of 29 Carthaginian ships.

In 216 Hasdrubal received orders from Carthage to move into Italy and join up with Hannibal to put pressure on the Romans in their homeland. Hasdrubal demurred, arguing that Carthaginian authority over the Iberian tribes was too fragile and the Roman forces in the area too strong for him to execute the planned movement. In 215 Hasdrubal eventually acted, besieging a pro-Roman town and offering battle at Dertosa, where he attempted to use his cavalry superiority to clear the flanks of the Roman army while enveloping their centre on both sides with his infantry. However, the Romans broke through the centre of the Carthaginian line and then defeated each wing separately, inflicting severe losses. It was no longer possible for Hasdrubal to reinforce Hannibal in Italy.

The Carthaginians suffered a wave of defections of local Celtiberian tribes to Rome. The Roman commanders captured Saguntum in 212BC and in 211BC hired 20,000 Celtiberian mercenaries to reinforce their army. Observing that the Carthaginian forces in Iberia were divided into three armies which were deployed apart from each other, the Romans split their forces. This strategy resulted in two separate battles in 211, usually referred to jointly as the battle of the Upper Baetis. Both battles ended in complete defeat for the Romans, as Hasdrubal had bribed the Romans' mercenaries to desert. The Roman survivors retreated to their coastal stronghold north of the Ebro, from which the Carthaginians again failed to expel them. Claudius Nero brought over reinforcements in 210BC and stabilised the situation.

Iberia, 211–205 BC 

In 210 BC Publius Cornelius Scipio, arrived in Iberia with further Roman reinforcements. In a carefully planned assault in 209BC he captured the lightly defended centre of Carthaginian power in Iberia, New Carthage, seizing a vast booty of gold, silver and siege artillery. He released the captured population and liberated the Iberian hostages held there by the Carthaginians, in an attempt to ensure the loyalty of their tribes.

In the spring of 208BC Hasdrubal moved to engage Scipio at the battle of Baecula. The Carthaginians were defeated, but Hasdrubal was able to withdraw the majority of his army and prevent any Roman pursuit; most of his losses were among his Iberian allies. Scipio was not able to prevent Hasdrubal from leading his depleted army over the western passes of the Pyrenees into Gaul. In 207BC, after recruiting heavily in Gaul, Hasdrubal crossed the Alps into Italy in an attempt to join his brother, Hannibal, but was defeated before he could.

In 206BC, at the battle of Ilipa, Scipio with 48,000 men, half Italian and half Iberian, defeated a Carthaginian army of 54,500 men and 32 elephants. This sealed the fate of the Carthaginians in Iberia. The last Carthaginian-held city in Iberia, Gades, defected to the Romans. Later the same year a mutiny broke out among Roman troops, which attracted support from Iberian leaders, disappointed that Roman forces had remained in the peninsula after the expulsion of the Carthaginians, but it was put down by Scipio. In 205BC an attempt was made by Mago to recapture New Carthage when the Roman occupiers were shaken by another mutiny and an Iberian uprising, but he was repulsed. Mago left Iberia for northern Italy with his remaining forces. In 203BC Carthage succeeded in recruiting at least 4,000 mercenaries from Iberia, despite Rome's nominal control.

Africa

Africa, 213–206 BC 

In 213BC Syphax, a powerful Numidian king in North Africa, declared for Rome. In response Carthaginian troops were sent to North Africa from Spain. In 206BC the Carthaginians ended this drain on their resources by dividing several Numidian kingdoms with Syphax. One of those disinherited was the Numidian prince Masinissa, who was thus driven into the arms of Rome.

Roman invasion of Africa, 204–201 BC 
In 205BC Publius Scipio was given command of the legions in Sicily and allowed to enrol volunteers for his plan to end the war by an invasion of Africa. After landing in Africa in 204BC he was joined by Masinissa and a force of Numidian cavalry. Scipio twice gave battle and destroyed two large Carthaginian armies. After the second encounter Syphax was pursued and taken prisoner by Masinissa at the battle of Cirta; Masinissa then seized most of Syphax's kingdom with Roman help.

Rome and Carthage entered into peace negotiations and Carthage recalled both Hannibal and Mago from Italy. The Roman Senate ratified a draft treaty, but because of mistrust and a surge in confidence when Hannibal arrived from Italy, Carthage repudiated it. Hannibal was placed in command of another army, formed from his veterans from Italy and newly raised troops from Africa, but with few cavalry. The decisive battle of Zama followed in October 202BC. Unlike most battles of the Second Punic War, the Romans had superiority in cavalry and the Carthaginians in infantry. Hannibal attempted to use 80 elephants to break into the Roman infantry formation, but the Romans countered them effectively and the elephants routed back through the Carthaginian ranks. The Roman and allied Numidian cavalry then pressed their attacks and drove the Carthaginian cavalry from the field. The two sides' infantry fought inconclusively until the Roman cavalry returned and attacked the Carthaginian rear. The Carthaginian formation collapsed; Hannibal was one of the few to escape the field.

Roman victory 

The new peace treaty dictated by Rome stripped Carthage of all of its overseas territories and some of its African ones. An indemnity of 10,000 talents of silver was to be paid over 50 years and hostages were taken. Carthage was forbidden to possess war elephants and its fleet was restricted to ten warships. It was prohibited from waging war outside Africa and in Africa only with Rome's permission. Many senior Carthaginians wanted to reject the treaty but Hannibal spoke strongly in its favour and it was accepted in spring 201BC. Henceforth it was clear Carthage was politically subordinate to Rome. Scipio was awarded a triumph and received the  "Africanus".

Rome's African ally, King Masinissa of Numidia, exploited the prohibition on Carthage waging war to repeatedly raid and seize Carthaginian territory with impunity. In 149 BC, fifty years after the end of the Second Punic War, Carthage sent an army, under Hasdrubal, against Masinissa, the treaty notwithstanding. The campaign ended in disaster at the battle of Oroscopa and anti-Carthaginian factions in Rome used the illicit military action as a pretext to prepare a punitive expedition. The Third Punic War began later in 149 BC when a large Roman army landed in North Africa and besieged Carthage. In the spring of 146 BC the Romans launched their final assault, systematically destroying the city and killing its inhabitants; 50,000 survivors were sold into slavery. The formerly Carthaginian territories became the Roman province of Africa. It was a century before the site of Carthage was rebuilt as a Roman city.

Notes, citations and sources

Notes

Citations

Sources

External links 

 Polybius's The History

 
200s BC conflicts
210s BC conflicts
Punic War 02
Punic War 02
Hannibal
.02
Wars involving Carthage
Wars involving the Roman Republic
Malta in the Roman era